The Willys 77 was an American car first sold in 1933 by Willys-Overland from Toledo. It was a successor to the Willys Whippet.

In the same year, Willys-Overland went into receivership but the 77 was still released on the market.

The wheelbase was only   and the car was sold at a price below $500, making it the cheapest American car of its era. The car was also highly economical, delivering 25 miles per gallon.

The 77 had a top speed of 65 mph, which made it a good base for equipping a racing car. A tuned-up Willys 77 achieved an average speed of 65.2 mph in the 24-hour race on the Muroc Dry Lake.

In the years leading up to the United States participation in World War II the model range was continued under the names Willys 37, Willys 38, Willys 48, Willys Speedway and Willys Americar.

When civilian auto production was discontinued in 1942, the car disappeared from the market.

Racing
The 1933-36 Willys coupés and pickups were very popular gassers. The best-known would be the 1933 Model 77.    Only 12,800 were sold in 1933, 13,234 in 1934, 10,644 in 1935 (including a new panel delivery), and 30,825 the company's final year, making it a puzzle why it became popular:  it was neither cheap nor plentiful.

Notes

Sources

Kimes, Beverly Rae, Clark, Henry A.: Standard Catalog of American Cars 1805-1942, 1st edition, Krause Publications Inc., Iola (Wisconsin) (1985), 
Taylor, Thom.  "Wrenchin' @Random:  Why the Rare Willys Was the Go-To Gasser" Hot Rod Network online (accessed 19 April 2017)</ref>  

77